Minacraga hyalina is a moth in the family Dalceridae. It was described by S.E. Miller in 1994. It is found in Suriname, French Guiana, Peru and northern Brazil (Amazon Basin). The habitat consists of tropical moist forests.

The length of the forewings is 12–15 mm. The forewings are buff, darker along the costal margin. The subterminal line has brown 
inside and white outside. The discal spot and apex are brown. The hindwings are buff. Adults are on wing in March and May.

Etymology
The species name refers to the hyaline wings, which distinguish it from other species in the genus Minacraga.

References

Moths described in 1994
Dalceridae